1969 Non-Aligned Movement Consultative Meeting took place in Belgrade, SR Serbia, SFR Yugoslavia on 8–12 July following the Warsaw Pact invasion of Czechoslovakia in August 1968. Non-interventionism was put on the top of the agenda by the host nation while the discussion over the national liberation caused some divisions with Algeria requesting their full participation but only Palestine Liberation Organization being granted the right to participate on equal footing. Algeria in turn blocked Yugoslav proposal to admit countries formally aligned in military pacts but pursuing policy close to non-alignment such as the Socialist Republic of Romania and Czechoslovak Socialist Republic which tried to distance themselves from Soviet led Warsaw Pact and Malaysia, Singapore, Tunisia and Pakistan most of which were part of Western led Baghdad Pact or Southeast Asia Treaty Organization.

On February 7 1969 President of Yugoslavia Josip Broz Tito announced the Yugoslav intention to organize the conference in the presence of the President of Egypt Gamal Abdel Nasser and following the consultations and agreement of India, Indonesia, Afghanistan, Ethiopia and Egypt. 51 nations participated in the final session of the meeting with delegations of Chad and Sierra Leone arriving late only after the meeting already started.

References

See also
 Foreign relations of Yugoslavia
 Soviet Union–Yugoslavia relations
 Czechoslovakia–Yugoslavia relations

Consultative Meeting
Foreign relations of Yugoslavia
History of Belgrade
1969 conferences
1969 in politics
1969 in Yugoslavia
Warsaw Pact invasion of Czechoslovakia